Tony Vigorito is an American author. His published books include Just a Couple of Days, Nine Kinds of Naked, and Love and Other Pranks.

Published books
Just a Couple of Days (Mariner Books, 2007) 
Nine Kinds of Naked (Mariner Books, 2008) 
Love and Other Pranks (Möbius, 2017)

References

External links

 Tony Vigorito's Website

Year of birth missing (living people)
Living people
21st-century American novelists
American male novelists
21st-century American male writers